Amir Subhani is a 1987 batch Indian Administrative Service (IAS) officer from Bihar Cadre. He is the current Chief Secretary to Government of Bihar. Subhani was the 1987 batch UPSC-Civil Services Examination (CSE) topper securing All-India Rank - 1.

Career 
Amir Subhani began his career as Sub Divisional Officer. In 1993, he was appointed as District Collector of Bhojpur district and then of Patna in 1994. In 2005, he became the Chairman of Bihar State Milk Co-operative Federation. Subhani has served in various positions in the Government of Bihar like Principal Secretary, Secretary of Home Department. On 1 January 2022, Amir Subhani took charge as the Chief Secretary of State of Bihar becoming first chief secretary of Bihar from a minority group.

References 

Indian Administrative Service officers
Living people
1964 births
Bihar